Diptychophlia hubrechti is a species of sea snail, a marine gastropod mollusk in the family Borsoniidae.

Description

Distribution
This marine species occurs off in the Atlantic Ocean off Northeast Brasil.

References

 Cunha C.M. (2005) Diptychophlia hubrechti, a new species (Caenogastropoda, Turridae) from off northeastern Brazil. Strombus 12, Suppl. 1: 12-15.

External links
 

hubrechti
Gastropods described in 2005